Tessie Eria Lambourne (born 14 July 1971 in the Gilbert and Ellice Islands) is an I-Kiribati civil servant, diplomat and politician. She has been a member of the Maneaba ni Maungatabu (Parliament) since April 2020. She was formerly Kiribati's Ambassador to the Republic of China (Taiwan) from June 2018 to September 2019 and Secretary to the Cabinet, the highest position in Kiribati's civil service, from August 2016 until June 2018.

Personal life
Lambourne was educated at the University of Auckland in New Zealand, where she graduated with a Bachelor of Arts (Political Studies) in 1994; she subsequently received a master's degree in International Law and Politics from the University of Canterbury in 2007. She worked in the civil service from 1991, serving in a number of prominent positions, including Private Secretary to President Teburoro Tito, Secretary for Foreign Affairs and Immigration, Secretary for Internal Affairs, and Secretary for Commerce, Industry and Cooperatives. She was appointed Secretary to the Cabinet by President Taneti Maamau in August 2016. She served in this role until she became the country's second ambassador to the Republic of China (Taiwan) in June 2018, but her tenure was ended by the breakdown of diplomatic relations between Kiribati and Taiwan on 20 September 2019.

She was elected to the Maneaba ni Maungatabu at the 2020 Kiribati parliamentary election in April 2020, winning 1 of the 2 seats for the island of Abemama "decisively" with a first-round majority. Lambourne is the chair of the newly formed Boutokaan Kiribati Moa party and the leader of opposition.

She is married to Hon. Judge David Lambourne, an Australian living in Kiribati, who was sworn in as first puisne judge to the High Court of Kiribati in 2018.

References

1971 births
Living people
Gilbert and Ellice Islands people
Ambassadors of Kiribati to Taiwan
Members of the House of Assembly (Kiribati)
Boutokaan Kiribati Moa Party politicians
Women government ministers of Kiribati
University of Auckland alumni
University of Canterbury alumni
20th-century I-Kiribati women
21st-century I-Kiribati women politicians
21st-century I-Kiribati politicians
21st-century I-Kiribati women lawyers